Euchareena is a town in the Orana region of New South Wales, Australia. At the 2006 census, Euchareena and the surrounding area had a population of 314.

It has a public school.

Heritage listings
Euchareena has a number of heritage-listed sites, including:
 2531 Euchareena Road: Nubrygyn Inn and Cemetery

References

External links
 Wellington-NSW:Euchareena 

Towns in New South Wales
Towns in the Central West (New South Wales)
Dubbo Regional Council
Main Western railway line, New South Wales